"Non so che darei" ("I don't know what I'd give") was the  entry in the Eurovision Song Contest 1980, performed in Italian by Alan Sorrenti.

Background 
The song deals with Sorrenti's feelings for his lover. He tells her that he does not know what he would do if he were to lose her and also that he does not know what he would give to stop time and be able to spend the night with her. The song was a massive success in Italy, staying on the first place of the Italian hit parade for over two months, and got Sorrenti a  award. Sorrenti also recorded an English-language version of the song  with the title "If You Need Me Now".

At Eurovision 
The song was performed sixth on the night, following 's Samira Bensaïd with "Bitaqat Hub" and preceding 's Bamses Venner with "Tænker altid på dig". At the close of voting, it had received 87 points, placing 6th in a field of 19.

Thus, the song was succeeded as Italian representative at the 1983 contest by Riccardo Fogli with "Per Lucia".

Charts

Notes

Eurovision songs of Italy
Eurovision songs of 1980
1980 songs
Number-one singles in Italy